Kidnapped in New York is a 1914 film American silent short drama film starring Barney Gilmore. The film survives and has been released on DVD.

Synopsis
Detective Dooley (Barney Gilmore) goes undercover in an Italian immigrant neighborhood posing as a harmless drunk in order to find a wealthy man's daughter and nurse who had been kidnapped by criminals.

Cast
 Barney Gilmore as Detective Dooley
 Marie Osborne as Toots, the Baby (credited as Baby Osborne)
 Violet Stuart as The Nurse (credited as Violet Stewart)

References

External links

1914 films
1914 drama films
American silent feature films
American black-and-white films
Silent American drama films
1910s American films